Plisko Polje is a village in Croatia, located on the island of Vis. It is connected by the D117 highway.

References

Populated places in Split-Dalmatia County